Kakamakhi (Dargwa: Кьакьамахьи) is a rural locality (a selo) and the administrative centre of Kakamakhinsky Selsoviet, Levashinsky District, Republic of Dagestan, Russia. The population was 2,647 as of 2010. There are 9 streets.

Geography 
Kakamakhi is located 5 km southwest of Levashi (the district's administrative centre) by road, on the Khalagork River. Ditunshimakhi and Naskent are the nearest rural localities.

Nationalities 
Dargins live there.

References 

Rural localities in Levashinsky District